Hiram E. Chodosh (born 1962) is the 5th and current president of Claremont McKenna College in Claremont, California.

Early life and education 
Hiram Chodosh was born in Elizabeth, New Jersey in 1962. Raised in nearby Hillside, he graduated from Hillside High School.

He received his B.A. in history from Wesleyan University in 1985, and his J.D. in 1990 from Yale Law School. In his second year at Yale, Chodosh met his wife, Priya Junnar.

Career 
Chodosh began his law career in 1990 at Cleary Gottlieb Steen & Hamilton and left in 1993 to join the faculty of Case Western Reserve University School of Law. In 2003, Chodosh was named a Fulbright Senior Scholar and played a central role in the practice and expansion of mediation in India.

In 2006, Chodosh was appointed as Dean of the S.J. Quinney College of Law at the University of Utah. Under a grant from the U.S. Department of State in 2007, Chodosh founded and directed the Global Justice Project, a law and policy think tank, to advise the Iraqi government. In recognition of his international efforts in legal reform and advocacy for mediation, Chodosh was awarded the Gandhi Peace Award in 2011. In February 2012, he was appointed as the Hugh B. Brown Endowed Chair of the University.

In December 2012, he was selected to be the 5th President of Claremont McKenna College.

Claremont McKenna College 

Under Chodosh's leadership, Claremont McKenna College has been able to raise over $200 million in new funding for scholarship and special student opportunities, as well as create new institutions and centers such as the CARE Center, the Soll Center for Student Opportunities, Roberts Pavilion, the Policy Lab, the Murty Sunak Quantitative and Computing Lab, and the Open Academy.

Selected works

Books 

 Global Justice Reform: A Comparative Methodology (NYU Press, 2005)
 Law in Iraq: A Document Companion (with co-editor Chibli Mallat, Oxford University Press, 2013)
 Uniform Civil Code for India: Proposed Blueprint for Scholarly Discourse (with Shimon Shetreet, Oxford University Press, 2016)

References 

1962 births
Living people
Claremont McKenna College
Hillside High School (New Jersey) alumni
People from Elizabeth, New Jersey
People from Hillside, New Jersey
Wesleyan University alumni
Yale Law School alumni